Brahmanical System of Education was an ancient system of education in ancient India. It was based on Vedic tradition. The main objective of the educational system was to make the students self-reliant. The curriculum of the system was based on Vedas. The important contributions of the system were developments of Upanishads, six schools of the Indian philosophy and the ancient texts of India.

Aims of Education 
Its main aim was all-round development of the human lives. It included the physical, mental and spiritual development of human life. It also included worldly aspect of the life. It focused on self-reliance, self-control, formation of character, individual development, knowledge of social and civil life and preservation of national culture.

Curriculum 
The curriculum of the educational system was focused to learn Vedic mantras, knowledge of religious rituals like ‘Karamkanda’ ‘Havan’ and ‘Yajna’. The course of study was much more vast than of Vedic period. It included all the four branches of 'Vedas' and the study of Itihas, Puranas, Vyakaran, Arithmetic, Shradha-kalp, Astrology, Ethics, Demonology, Yajur Veda, Nyaya Shastra, Smriti, Jyotish, Astronomy, Mathematics, Indian Philosophy, Surgery, Medicine, Literatures, Warfare, Archery, Snake-charming etc.

Principles of Education 
In the Brahmanical System, education fee  was free. There was a tradition of giving Gurudakshina to Acharya by his student who completed the study course of education. It was also not mandatory that Gurudakshina would be physical wealth, but it can be in any form. The education of a student started from Upanayana ritual. It was performed between four and nine years of age. After it, the student was sent to Gurukula for the study. In the upanayana an Acharya was assigned to the student. The Acharya took care of his students like father and impart proper education, training and guidance to them. The students had to study in the Gurukula for minimum of 12 years. There was regulated daily routine for students in the Gurukula. The motto before them was simple living and high thinking. A sense of discipline grew up among the disciples. The daily routine consisted of bathing, Yajna, Poojan, Bhiksha (going out for alms), serving the Guru ( teacher ), reading Vedas, etc. According to Atharvaveda proper rearing, education and suitable environment can bring everything to the students. Therefore in the Brahmanical education, building of character was given much attention. After upanayana ritual, the students were supposed to maintain strict celibacy. The strict celibacy was helpful in controlling of the senses and the mind. This led to the proper development of the personality of the students. The principles of education was not only theoretical but was also practical. The educational system was based on psychological principles so corporal punishment was considered as sin. Therefore, there was no corporal punishment in the educational system. In the Brahmanical system students were free to choose their specialisations according to their abilities. Karma-siddhanta and stratification of caste system had no effect on the courses of study in Brahmanical education.

Major Important Centres 
The major important centres of the Brahmanical System of Education were Takshashila University, Sharada Peeth, Kashi, Mithila University, Nabadwip University and many more ancient learning centres in South India.

See also 

 Yajnavalkya Ashram
 Gautam Ashram

References 

Educational Zone
History of education in India
Ashramas
Vedas
Upanishadic concepts
Indian philosophy
Hinduism
Ancient India